The 1975–76 Yugoslav Ice Hockey League season was the 34th season of the Yugoslav Ice Hockey League, the top level of ice hockey in Yugoslavia. 13 teams participated in the league, and Olimpija have won the championship.

Final ranking
Olimpija
Jesenice
Medveščak
Kranjska Gora
Partizan
Celje
Spartak Subotica
Red Star
Triglav Kranj
Tivoli
Vardar Skopje
Vojvodina
Ina Sisak

References

External links
Yugoslav Ice Hockey League seasons

Yugoslav
Yugoslav Ice Hockey League seasons
1975–76 in Yugoslav ice hockey